Eder Sarabia Armesto (born 27 September 1980) is a Spanish football manager and former player who played as a forward. He is the current manager of FC Andorra.

Playing career
Born in Bilbao, Biscay, Basque Country, Sarabia only played amateur football during his entire career; he played for SD Indautxu, SD Leioa, SD San Pedro and Arenas Club de Getxo's reserve team before retiring at the age of 24. He never played higher than the Tercera División.

Coaching career
Sarabia began his coaching career in 2003 with CFD Cruces' Infantil squad, and then worked at Danok Bat CF's youth categories.

In 2011, Sarabia moved to Villarreal CF, after being appointed manager of the Infantil side. After being in charge of the Juvenil squad in the 2012–13 campaign, he was named manager of the C-team on 1 October 2013, replacing Tito García Sanjuán.

Sarabia was sacked by the Yellow Submarine on 12 November 2013, after only one win in seven matches. In the following year, he led a Real Madrid academy project in the Dominican Republic.

In October 2015, Sarabia joined Quique Setién's staff after being named his assistant at UD Las Palmas. He followed Setién to Real Betis and FC Barcelona, again as his assistant.

While at Barcelona, Sarabia was pointed out by the media as the main reason of a relationship problem between the players and the coaching staff, being spotted often by the match cameras criticizing the players in matches; Lionel Messi ignored him during a match against RC Celta de Vigo. He later admitted an argument between the squad and the staff after that match.

On 18 January 2021, Sarabia was appointed manager of FC Andorra in Segunda División B, after agreeing to a two-and-a-half-year contract.

Personal life
Sarabia's father Manuel was also a footballer and a forward who played for Athletic Bilbao and CD Logroñés.

Managerial statistics

References

External links

1981 births
Living people
Footballers from Bilbao
Spanish footballers
Association football forwards
Tercera División players
Arenas Club de Getxo footballers
SD Leioa players
SD Indautxu footballers
Spanish football managers
Segunda División managers
Primera Federación managers
Segunda División B managers
Tercera División managers
FC Andorra managers
Real Betis non-playing staff
FC Barcelona non-playing staff